Jorge Bernardo Griffa Monferoni (born 7 May 1935) is a retired Argentine footballer. He played most of his career in Spain, playing mostly for Atlético Madrid, but after retiring, he decided to go back home to Newell's Old Boys and he began coaching its youth teams.

Griffa was part of the Argentina squad that won the Copa América in 1959

Honours
 Atlético Madrid
Copa del Generalísimo: 1959-60, 1960-61, 1964-65
Cup Winners' Cup: 1961-62
Spanish League: 1965-66

 Argentina
South American Championship: 1959

References

External links
 LFP
 
 Statistics at once-once.narod.ru

1935 births
Living people
Argentine footballers
Argentina international footballers
Newell's Old Boys footballers
La Liga players
Atlético Madrid footballers
RCD Espanyol footballers
Argentine Primera División players
Argentine expatriate sportspeople in Spain
Association football defenders
People from Casilda
Sportspeople from Santa Fe Province